The 2020–21 season is the 105th season of competitive association football in Thailand.

National teams

Thailand national football team

Results and fixtures

Friendlies

AFC competitions

AFC Champions League

Qualifying play-offs

Group stage

Group E

Thai competitions

Thai League 1

Thai League 2

Thai League 3

Cup competitions

Thai FA Cup

Final

Thailand Champions Cup

Managerial changes 
This is a list of changes of managers within Thai league football:

Notes

References

 
2020 sport-related lists
2021 sport-related lists
2021 in Thai football
Seasons in Thai football